The Westinghouse Sign was the first computer-controlled sign in the United States.  Located in Pittsburgh, Pennsylvania, the large animated display advertised the Westinghouse Electric Company, and was best known for the seemingly endless number of combinations in which its individual elements could be illuminated. The sign was removed in 1998 when the building on which it was mounted was demolished to make way for the construction of PNC Park.

History
On December 9, 1948, the Westinghouse Electric Supply Company (Wesco) moved into a new building located at 209 West General Robinson Street in the North Shore section of Pittsburgh.  Wesco was a wholesale distributor of electrical apparatus, and a subsidiary of the Westinghouse Electric Company founded by George Westinghouse in 1886.

For many years, a large orange and blue sign on the Wesco roof proclaimed the company's advertising slogan:  "You can be sure…if it’s Westinghouse."  The sign was pointed to the south, across the Allegheny River, making it easy to see from Downtown Pittsburgh.

Early in 1966, Westinghouse decided to replace the aging advertising sign on the Wesco Building.  The idea was to remove the slogan from the existing  support structure, and replace it with a modern view of the Westinghouse corporate identity.

In due course, Richard Huppertz, manager of design coordination at Westinghouse, developed a concept that would bring greater recognition to the 'circle w' logo created by graphic designer Paul Rand.  Rather than using words, the sign Huppertz had in mind would rely solely on the Westinghouse corporate mark.  The concept was then presented to Paul Rand, who produced a design emphasizing the nine elements of the logo he had illustrated in a 1960 graphics standards guide.

Construction and operation

The Pittsburgh Outdoor Advertising Corporation installed the Westinghouse sign in June 1967 using  of neon tubing filled with argon gas, giving the display its characteristic blue color. In later years, an extra element was added to each logo by allowing the top and bottom of the enclosing circle to be independently illuminated. The ninety element configuration increased the number of possible display combinations, but sacrificed the elegance of the original design.

The Wesco Building stood near Three Rivers Stadium, and its sign was one of several large illuminated corporate billboards that became a fixture of Pittsburgh's evening skyline.  Among the others were the Alcoa sign atop Mount Washington, and the Clark Bar sign on the D. L. Clark Company Building.

The sign was demolished when the Wesco Building was razed in the autumn of 1998 to make way for PNC Park, which succeeded Three Rivers as the home of the Pittsburgh Pirates.  Preservationists attempted to save at least one of the 'circle w' units for eventual display at the Heinz History Center. Both the physical structure and electrical components were in such a state of decay that nothing was salvageable.

Other signs
A second sign was located in Emeryville, California, facing the San Francisco Bay.

Smaller versions of the sign, using three repetitions of the 'circle w' insignia, were erected atop the Westinghouse Outdoor Lighting Plant in Cleveland, Ohio, and on the north side of the Long Island Expressway in Queens, New York.

Photo gallery

Combinations
It was commonly believed that there were practically an infinite number of sequences in which the sign's elements could be lit, and that no sequence was ever repeated. The Westinghouse Electric Corporation encouraged this perception. In reality, the cycle of display patterns would repeat every six minutes, employing a subset of 120 lighting combinations created by Westinghouse designers.  To heighten interest in the sign, lighting patterns would be changed from time to time by selecting different sequences from the 120 available displays.  A Westinghouse Prodac 50 computer controlled the sign, since it was well-suited to handling repetitive tasks.

See also
 Neon sign

References

External links

Archival photograph of the Wesco Building

Advertising structures
Buildings and structures in Pittsburgh
Individual signs in the United States
Westinghouse Electric Company
Advertising in the United States
Articles containing video clips
1967 establishments in Pennsylvania
1998 disestablishments in Pennsylvania